Agelanthus pennatulus is a species of hemiparasitic plant in the family Loranthaceae, which is found in Tanzania, and Kenya.

Description 
A description of the plant is given in Govaerts et al., based on Polhill & Wiens (1999).

Habitat/ecology
A. pennatulus has been found at altitudes of 1650–2400 m in both moist & dry evergreen forests.  Recorded hosts are Olea, Strombosia, Maytenus and various Rutaceae.

Threats 
The major threat is from forest clearance for agriculture (and forest disturbance).

References

Flora of Tanzania
Flora of Kenya
pennatulus